Legally Blondes is a 2009 American direct-to-DVD comedy television film. Filmed as a pilot to a cancelled television series, it is a spin-off of the Legally Blonde film series. It was directed by Savage Steve Holland and co-produced by Reese Witherspoon, who played Elle Woods in the first two Legally Blonde films. The film stars Camilla and Rebecca Rosso as Elle's British twin cousins.

The film was released on DVD on April 28, 2009, simultaneously with airing on ABC Family and Disney Channel.

Plot

British twin sisters Izzy and Annie Woods move in with their cousin Elle Woods in Southern California after Elle becomes a successful lobbyist and moves to Washington, D.C. Awaiting the girls are a pair of chihuahua dogs who are the nephews of Bruiser, Elle's chihuahua. The twins are dismayed to learn that they will be attending Pacific Preparatory (Pac Prep), Elle's alma mater, a private school that requires uniforms.

The twins meet Chris Lopez, a scholarship student who is smitten with Annie, and Tiffany Donohugh, the spoiled daughter of a wealthy donor of Pac Prep. Tiffany pretends to befriend them, but later reveals to their classmates that the twins are attending Pac Prep on a partial scholarship, embarrassing them. Izzy and Annie then form friendships with other scholarship students, and they all begin making ways to change Pac Prep's culture. Izzy also tries to help Chris get closer to Annie.

Chris and Izzy are later accused of cheating on a history test and set out to prove their innocence. After learning that Chris has access to a master key that opens all doors in the school and that Tiffany has a master passcode that grants access to all of the school's computers (which had been donated by her father), the twins suspect that she and her boyfriend Justin Whitley framed them by gaining access to the test answers on their teacher's computer.

They then make their case in student court. Izzy is locked in the bathroom by Justin in an effort to silence her during the hearing, forcing Annie to overcome her fear of public speaking and impersonate her. As Izzy returns, Annie must continue making her case while impersonating her sister to keep up the ruse. As Annie finishes her summation of Tiffany and Justin's plot, supporters of the twins click their pens to anger Justin, who is irritated by the sound. Out of rage, Justin admits to framing Chris and Izzy on Tiffany's behalf. Tiffany admits to masterminding everything, but claims that she cannot be punished because of her father's status as a founder and donor of the school. Despite this, headmistress Elsa Higgins expels both Justin and Tiffany.

In the end, Annie and Chris share a kiss together and Izzy does the same with Brad, a scholarship student who had assisted the twins in student court. The twins and their friends become popular at the school, while Tiffany and Justin are cut off from their families' wealth and sent to public school.

Cast

Reception
On Cinemablend.com, the film earned three stars out of five and received a moderately positive review.

On Rotten Tomatoes, the film has only two reviews, both negative.
David Nusair of Reel Film Reviews gave the film 1/4 and called it "As ineffective as direct-to-video sequels come" and "never quite able to justify its very existence." David Cornelius of DVD Talk wrote: "Reimagines the franchise in the tone of a Disney Channel sitcom. Oh, my."

Notes

References

External links
 
 

Legally Blonde (franchise)
2009 films
2009 comedy films
2009 direct-to-video films
2000s English-language films
2000s high school films
2000s teen comedy films
American direct-to-video films
2000s American films
American high school films
American sequel films
American teen comedy films
Direct-to-video comedy films
Direct-to-video sequel films
Films about twin sisters
Films directed by Savage Steve Holland
Films produced by Marc E. Platt
Films produced by Reese Witherspoon
Films set in California
Films shot in England
Films shot in Los Angeles
Metro-Goldwyn-Mayer direct-to-video films